Synechodes sumatrana is a moth in the family Brachodidae. It was described by Kallies in 2000. It is found on Sumatra.

References

Natural History Museum Lepidoptera generic names catalog

Brachodidae
Moths described in 2000